Thasthara was a town of ancient Caria. It was a polis (city-state) and a member of the Delian League.
 
Its site is located near Çavdarköy, Asiatic Turkey.

References

Populated places in ancient Caria
Former populated places in Turkey
Greek city-states
Members of the Delian League